Since the early 2020s, members of the far-right and a growing number of mainstream conservatives, mostly in the United States, have falsely accused LGBT people, as well as their allies and progressives in general, of systematically using LGBT-positive education and campaigns for LGBT rights as a method of child grooming. These accusations and conspiracy theories are characterized by experts as baseless, homophobic and transphobic, and as examples of moral panic.

Overview
The term groomer is derived from the practice of child grooming. However, as described by Vox,  conservatives are using it to "imply that the LGBTQ community, their allies, and liberals more generally are pedophiles or pedophile-enablers,". Research has shown that LGBT people do not molest children at higher rates than non-LGBT people.

History

Origins
In 1977, Anita Bryant and the Save Our Children coalition often described homosexuality as allegedly being harmful to children, while they were attempting to repeal an ordinance that partly banned discrimination based on sexuality. Bryant claimed "homosexuals cannot reproduce, so they must recruit... the youth of America".

The term "OK groomer" originated in 2020 as a play on the "OK boomer" meme.
In the United Kingdom, the conspiracy theory began to be popularized within the gender-critical movement around 2020. That year, anti-transgender activist Graham Linehan was banned from Twitter after he began to use "OK groomer" as a term of abuse against those who criticized his activism. The term was also borrowed by the pressure group Transgender Trend, which used it in material that it sent to schools in order to oppose the advice which was given to them by LGBT+ charities such as Stonewall. In March 2020, The Times columnist Janice Turner accused the charity Mermaids, which offers support for trans youth, of grooming for introducing an exit button on their website in response to the COVID-19 pandemic lockdown. The conspiracy has also been used by the far-right in the UK, including Tommy Robinson according to Hope not Hate.

Popularization

In the United States, the popularization of the term has been linked to Christopher Rufo, who tweeted about "winning the language war", and James A. Lindsay in August 2021. Following the Wi Spa controversy in July 2021, Julia Serano noted a rise in false accusations of grooming directed towards transgender people, saying that it appeared as if there was a movement to "lay the foundation for just smearing all trans people as child sexual predators". Libs of TikTok (LoTT) also slurs LGBT people, supporters of LGBT youth, and those who teach about sexuality as "groomers." In November 2021 LoTT falsely claimed that the Trevor Project was a "grooming organization" and later in the year falsely claimed that Chasten Buttigieg was "grooming kids". LoTT creator Chaya Raichik said on the Tucker Carlson Today show that LGBT people "Want to groom kids. They’re recruiting."

The conspiracy theory then moved into the American conservative mainstream, with a number of high-profile cases of its use in Spring 2022, including its use by members of the Republican Party. On February 24, the right-wing The Heritage Foundation issued a tweet stating that the Florida Parental Rights in Education Act "protects young children from sexual grooming". During the debate over the act, Christina Pushaw, press secretary to the state's governor Ron DeSantis, tweeted that anyone who opposes the act was "probably a groomer". In April 2022, Marjorie Taylor Greene referred to the Democratic Party as "the party of killing babies, grooming and transitioning children, and pro-pedophile politics". Also that month, a group of far-right extremists and conspiracy theorists held a demonstration at Disney World in which they accused Disney of grooming. Disney has been the focus of several other uses of the conspiracy – Jim Banks and 19 other members of the Republican Study Committee published a letter to Disney accusing the corporation of "purposefully influencing small children with its political and sexual agenda".

Since then, numerous right wing pundits have described the behavior of parents and teachers who support minors in their transgender identities as grooming, and the term "groomer" has widely been used by conservative media and politicians who want to denounce the LGBT community and its allies by implying that they are pedophiles or pedophile-enablers. Slate Magazine later described the word "grooming" as "the buzzword of the season". In March 2022, Fox News host Laura Ingraham claimed that schools were becoming "grooming centers for gender identity radicals", dedicating an entire segment of her show to the topic a couple of weeks later. In April 2022, the left-leaning media watchdog Media Matters published a study stating that within a three week period spanning from March 17 to April 6, Fox News ran 170 segments on trans people, throughout which the network "repeatedly invoked the long-debunked myth that trans people pose a threat to minors and seek to groom them".

Since 2019, protesters have targeted Drag Queen Story Hour events at public facilities and private venues. Appearing on Fox News, Chris Rufo characterized child-friendly drag as an attempt to "sexualize children," "subvert the middle-class family," and "eliminate what they call the sexual hierarchy in favor of creating a sexual connection between adult and child." In June 2022, Twitter mentions of Drag Queen Story Hour increased by over 700 percent, according to media intelligence company Zignal Labs. Also in June, members of the far-right group Proud Boys stormed and disrupted multiple events at local libraries and bookstores. At a California library, protesters reportedly shouted homophobic and transphobic slurs. The event had been targeted in a Twitter thread by Libs of TikTok. In Nevada, one protester approached with a gun, causing patrons to shelter in the library. Several libraries have cancelled events upon receiving threatening communications. Juliette Kayyem, Harvard professor and former DHS assistant secretary, has described these incidents of violence as examples of stochastic terrorism.

In August 2022, a joint report which was published by the American Human Rights Campaign  and the British Center for Countering Digital Hate revealed that the 500 most influential hateful "grooming" tweets were seen 72 million times, and it also stated that "grooming" tweets from just ten influential sources were seen 48 million times. It also revealed that Meta, formerly known as Facebook, had accepted up to $24,987 for advertisements which pushed the grooming conspiracy theory, the advertisements had been served to users over 2.1 million times, and Twitter, despite saying that groomer slurs were violations of its hate speech policy, failed to act on 99% of tweets which were reported as such. The report also recorded a 406% increase in the use of tweets associating members of the LGBT community with being "groomers", "pedophiles", and "predators" following the passage of Florida's Parental Rights in Education Act, called the "Don't Say Gay Law" by its critics.

Also in August 2022, Jamestown, Michigan voted to defund Patmos Library, the town's only public library, over accusations of "grooming" children and promoting an "LGBTQ ideology".

In March 2023, three protesters disrupted drag performer Medulla Oblongata's storytime reading session at the Avondale Library in Auckland, New Zealand. The reading session was part of "Pride Fest Out West," which involved dancing, songs, and stories told by a drag performer. In response, Police trespassed the protesters. Auckland Council official Darryl Soljan linked the protest to international media coverage of anti-LGBT opponents in the United States accusing drag performers and the LGBT community of grooming children and pedophilia. In March, a show called CabaBabaRave for mothers and infants was forced to be canceled after footage of performers was shared on social media by conservative pages. CabaBabaRave’s website, Instagram, and Facebook pages were also forced to be made private. Organizers claimed that the footage was being shared out of context and infants are unable to comprehend the performances and the shows are not different from other R-rated movie shows.

Responses and criticism
Reddit, TikTok, Meta (parent company of Facebook and Instagram) and formerly Twitter (prior to Elon Musk's buyout of the company) have said that using "groomer" as a slur against LGBT people violates their policies.

Vox argued that the rhetoric which is used by proponents of the grooming conspiracy theory is similar to the rhetoric which was used by proponents of older conspiracy theories like the Pizzagate conspiracy theory and QAnon: "grooming accusations aren't concerned with making sense; they're about stirring up fear, anger, and hysteria — which is why they sound exactly like the kinds of fringe conspiracy theories that have been around for centuries. The new pedophile conspiracy rhetoric is essentially the same as all the old pedophile conspiracy rhetoric." Writing in New York, James Kirchick argues that the grooming conspiracy theory grew out of more generalized homophobic conspiracy theories which originated in Germany in the early 20th century and that, in particular, it grew out of the Eulenburg affair.

Kristen Mark of the University of Minnesota Medical School has described the conspiracy as "a tool to create hysteria and to create a social panic", calling it "frankly inaccurate". Emily Johnson of Ball State University has also described it as a moral panic, saying that there is "no better moral panic than a moral panic centered on potential harm to children". Alejandra Caraballo of the Berkman Klein Center for Internet & Society has described it as "an attempt at the dehumanization and delegitimization of queer people's identities by associating them with pedophilia", adding that "when you start labeling groups with that, the calls for violence are inevitable." Jenifer McGuire, a professor in the department of family social science at the University of Minnesota, said that the grooming conspiracy theory comes "from an underlying desire to separate people who are different and to characterize them as less than or as evil. So it's a new form of homophobia and transphobia — or it's maybe the same old form but with new language." R.G. Cravens of California Polytechnic State University has described the conspiracy as "completely, patently false".

The Canadian Anti-Hate Network has stated that trans people are "slandered the same way homosexual men were slandered in the 70s, and for the same reason: to deny them safety and equal rights", adding that "the far-right and their fellow travellers in the so-called Gender Critical or Trans-Exclusionary Radical Feminist movements use the exact same tropes in a bid to deny equal rights to trans persons." Florence Ashley, a professor at the University of Toronto, has stated that the conspiracy theory's focus on LGBT people in general and its focus on trans people in particular is being used to radicalize public opinion towards the far-right, comparing it to the great replacement conspiracy theory.

The Associated Press described the conspiracy theory as "another volley in the [United States'] ongoing culture wars, during which conservative lawmakers have also opposed the teaching of 'critical race theory' and proposed bills requiring schools to post all course materials online so parents can review them." According to the AP Stylebook, "Some people use the word groom or variants of it to falsely liken LGBTQ people's interactions with children, or education about LGBTQ issues, to the actions of child molesters. Do not quote people using the term in this context without clearly stating it is untrue."

Charles T. Moran, President of the Log Cabin Republicans, called the conspiracy theory a "subtle subterfuge that gays are pedophiles", adding that "I will take flak from people that this is reinforcing a trope that is not beneficial for anybody who's gay in public life. Pedophiles exist at a much higher proportion in the straight community than the gay community, but it is always a shtick our critics will go back to." 

A school librarian in Louisiana has filed a lawsuit alleging defamation by Facebook pages that falsely accused her of pedophilia.

Public opinion
An April 2022 survey by left-wing think tank Data for Progress found that 45 percent of likely Republican voters believe that "teachers and parents that support discussions about sexual orientation and gender identity in school are groomers."

See also
 Anti-gender movement
 Anti-LGBT rhetoric
 Day-care sex-abuse hysteria
 Drag panic
 Litter boxes in schools hoax
 McMartin preschool trial
 Section 28

References

2021 controversies in the United States
2022 controversies in the United States
2020s in LGBT history
Conservatism
False allegations of sex crimes
Far-right politics
Homophobia
LGBT-related conspiracy theories
Moral panic
Transphobia
Conspiracy theories in the United States
Right-wing politics